Jacques ("Jack") Pani (born 21 May 1946 in Troyes, Aube) is a retired French long jumper. His personal best jump was 8.16 metres, achieved in June 1969 in Pulversheim.  He married Nicole Pani who was a well known French sprinter.

Achievements

References

1946 births
Living people
French male long jumpers
Athletes (track and field) at the 1968 Summer Olympics
Olympic athletes of France
Sportspeople from Troyes
Mediterranean Games gold medalists for France
Mediterranean Games medalists in athletics
Athletes (track and field) at the 1971 Mediterranean Games
21st-century French people
20th-century French people